Paradoxaholic is the second solo album by Will Rigby, released on April 23, 2002 on Diesel Only Records. It is also his first solo album in 17 years, since Sidekick Phenomenon was released in 1985. Paradoxaholic was notably more planned-out than Sidekick Phenomenon was. It was recorded during Rigby's time as a session musician, during which he exchanged time doing sessions for the opportunity to record his own music in the studio.

Title
Rigby coined the word "paradoxaholic" to be the album's title. In 2002, he explained to Nashville Scene what this term meant to him:

Track listing
Got You Up My Sleeve	
This Song Isn't Even About You	
The Sweeter Thing To Do	
...Wheelchair, Drunk	
Leanin' On Bob	
Get Away Get Away	
The Jerks At Work	
Samamaranda	
Midas Beige	
If I Can't Be A King	
Flap Down	
Sensible Shoes

Personnel
Bruce Bennett – guitars, background vocals
Martin Bisi – engineer
Mike Caiati – engineer
Stephanie Chernikowski – design, photography
Pete DeCoste – drums
Jim DeMain – mastering
Jim Duffy – organ
Jon Graboff – guitars
Gene Holder – bass, engineer
Mickey McMahan – drawing
Blackie Pagano – bass
Nancy Polstein – drums
Will Rigby – drums, keyboard bass, keyboards, ergan, producer, programming, tambourine, vocals, background vocals
Dave Schramm – guitar
Lianne Smith – vocals
Mark Spencer – bass, engineer, guitar

References

2002 albums
Diesel Only Records albums